is a professional baseball player from Yamato, Kanagawa, Japan. He is a retired pitcher for the Yokohama BayStars.

Kawamura won 17 games in 1999 as a starter, and became a reliever in 2004. He marked a 2.31 ERA in 2005, and returned to the starting rotation in 2007.

He won a silver medal playing for the Japanese national team in the 1996 Summer Olympics before entering the Japanese professional leagues.

External links

1972 births
Living people
People from Yamato, Kanagawa
Baseball people from Kanagawa Prefecture
Rikkyo University alumni
Nippon Professional Baseball pitchers
Baseball players at the 1996 Summer Olympics
Olympic baseball players of Japan
Olympic silver medalists for Japan
Olympic medalists in baseball
Yokohama BayStars players
Japanese baseball coaches
Nippon Professional Baseball coaches
Medalists at the 1996 Summer Olympics